is a Japanese noise music project, founded in 1984 by . Ohno is known for making his own experimental electric guitars out of spare parts and using them in his live performances and recordings; the guitars usually take an extremely bizarre form, utilizing unconventional body shapes, extra necks, strings and pickups in unusual places, and various extraneous gadgets such as microphones. Most of their instruments are multi-neck guitars and harp guitars.

Masahiko Ohno also works as a graphic designer, and has worked on almost all the releases on Alchemy Records and Hören.

Discography
 Gakinoizz (1984)
 H·A·D·A·Y·R·O (1985)
 Vexation (1985)
 H.C.P. Resolvent (1985)
 Wörkenemy (1985)
 Re-Rurr (1985)
 Energetic Enema (1986) (with Kyōakukyōjindan)
 Highdrophobia (1986)
 Erosion (1987)
 Metamorphor Chorus (1991)
 Morphine Nocturne (1992)
 Psycledelic (1993)
 Trembling Tongues (1995)
 Evil Bed (1996)
 DLO (1998)
 Live-Big Rig (1993)
 The Basement Tapes and Discs (2013)
 Kill (2016)

External links

Japanese noise rock groups
Musical groups from Osaka